Federal Highway 70 (Carretera Federal 70) (Fed. 70) is a free (libre) part of the federal highways corridors (los corredores carreteros federales) of Mexico. The highway runs from its western end in the town of Mascota, Jalisco to its eastern end at Fed. 80 and Fed. 180 in Tampico, Tamaulipas.

References

070
Transportation in San Luis Potosí
Transportation in Tamaulipas
Transportation in Zacatecas